Puya potosina is a species in the genus Puya. This species is endemic to Bolivia.

References

potosina
Flora of Bolivia
Plants described in 1961